Robert H. Roche (October 1, 1891 – February 4, 1981) was an American farmer and politician.

Born in Doylestown, Columbia County, Wisconsin, Roche went to Columbus High School, in Columbus, Wisconsin. He  was a farmer. From 1933 to 1937, Roche served as sheriff of Columbia County and was a Democrat. In 1937, Roche served in the Wisconsin Assembly. Roche died at the Columbus Community Hospital in Columbus, Wisconsin.

Notes

1891 births
1981 deaths
People from Columbia County, Wisconsin
Farmers from Wisconsin
Wisconsin sheriffs
Democratic Party members of the Wisconsin State Assembly
20th-century American politicians